Lily White may refer to:

Lily White (photographer) (1866–1944)
Lily White, a character in the Touhou Project video game series 
Lily White, a member of the lily-white movement of the U.S. Republican Party 
lily white, a sub-unit in the media-mix project Love Live!

See also
 Lillywhite (surname) 
 Lilywhites (disambiguation)